{{DISPLAYTITLE:C16H24N2O}}
The molecular formula C16H24N2O (molar mass : 260.38 g/mol) may refer to:

 4-HO-DiPT, a synthetic hallucinogen
 5-HO-DiPT
 4-HO-DPT
 5-MeO-EiPT
 5-MeO-EPT
 Oxymetazoline
 Ropinirole, a non-ergoline dopamine agonist